Zela is a minor Bantu language of the Democratic Republic of Congo. It is closely related to Luba-Katanga.

References

Luban languages
Languages of the Democratic Republic of the Congo